The following is a list of Flags used in Djibouti for more information about the national flag, see the Flag of Djibouti

National Flag

Military Flag

Political Party Flags

Historical Flags

See also 

 Flag of Djibouti
 Emblem of Djibouti

References 

Lists and galleries of flags
Flags